Ma Liwen (born 1971) is a female Chinese film director. She has directed a handful of films during the 2000s, including 2005's You and Me, and two films in 2008, Lost and Found and Desires of the Heart.

Biography 
Born Ma Xiaoying in 1971 in Jiangxi province, Ma would move to Beijing in the early 1990s. She graduated from the Central Academy of Drama in 1994, and is one of Fifth Generation director Tian Zhuangzhuang's protégés along with Ning Hao. Her debut film, Gone Is the One Who Held Me Dearest in the World, was shot on a small budget.

In 2005, Ma Liwen directed You and Me, which drew on her own experiences living in a small courtyard apartment in Beijing. The film won the Ma a Golden Rooster for Best Director in 2005 and Best Actress award for actress Jin Yaqin.

Filmography

References

External links

Ma Liwen at the Chinese Film Database

Film directors from Jiangxi
Chinese women film directors
1971 births
Living people
Central Academy of Drama alumni
Chinese film directors